Giambattista Suardi (January 9, 1711 – March 2, 1767) was an Italian mathematician.

Life 
Born into a noble family in Brescia, he studied mathematics in Padua. Suardi graduated in 1773 under the supervision of Giovanni Poleni. In 1752 he published an essay on drawing and mathematics tools: .

He married Cecilia Curti, a Venetian woman.

Works

References

Italian mathematicians
People from Brescia
1711 births
1767 deaths
University of Padua alumni